The Devil's Playground is a 1928 Australian feature-length film set in the South Seas. It was produced by a largely amateur group from the north shore of Sydney.

Production
The film was made by a largely amateur group who formed a company, Fineart Film, in 1927 with a capital of £2,000.

Their first production was the Pacific island adventure, Trobriana, which was never released. Scenes were shot on beaches near Sydney and interiors in the Mosman Town Hall. Natives were played by Sydney life guards in black face.

It was known during filming as Pearl of the Pacific.

Cast member Elza Stenning later became well known as Sydney socialite Elsa Jacoby.

Release
The film sold to Universal Pictures in England. However, the censor prevented its export. According to the Sydney Morning Herald at the time, 
"The Commonwealth censorship regulations specify the following heads under which a film may be condemned:
(a) Blasphemy, indecency, or obscenity; 
(b) likely to be injurious to morality, or to encourage or incite to crime; 
(c) likely to be offensive to the people of any friendly nation; 
(d) likely to be offensive to the people of the British Empire; 
(e) depiction of any matter the exhibition of which is undesirable in the public interest, or likely to prove detrimental or prejudicial to the Commonwealth. 
According to the Chief Censor, "The Devil's Playground" violates four out of the five stipulations, namely (a), (b), (d), and (e).
More specifically, relating to (e), the Controller General of Custmos O'Reilly thought that showing ill-treatment of natives by Australians or a native revolt in Australian territory (the Trobriand Islands) would be detrimental to Australia's reputation. Not released in Australia, the film "had no more than trade screenings at the time of its production and was not shown publicly until 1966".

References

External links
 
 The Devil's Playground at National Film and Sound Archive

1928 films
Australian silent feature films
Films set in Papua New Guinea
Trobriand Islands
Australian black-and-white films